Goageb is a former settlement  in the ǁKaras Region of southern Namibia. Of Nama origin, the name means "twin rivers". Formerly known as Konkiep, an adaptation of the same name, it takes its name from the Konkiep River, a tributary of the Fish River.

References

Populated places in the ǁKaras Region